Sarah Amalia Jorge León (born 27 November 1982) is an actress, writer and producer from the Dominican Republic.

Life and career
Jorge León was born in Santo Domingo, Dominican Republic. She is the oldest of three children, with siblings Marcos Jorge León and actress Nina Jorge León. Her parents are María Amalia León Cabral, arts patron, philanthropist, and director of the Eduardo León Jimenes Foundation – the elder of two daughters of businessman José León Asensio –, and civil engineer, Marcos Augusto Jorge Elías. She is great-greanddaughter of businessmen José María Cabral Bermúdez and Eduardo León Jimenes; she is also descended from Dominican presidents Buenaventura Báez, Ulises Espaillat, and Marco Antonio Cabral.

Miss Jorge León is a psychology graduate (concentration: drama / communications) (cum laude) from Manhattanville College and also holds a Master of Fine Arts (acting) from the ART / MXAT program at Harvard University; this program requires a six-month residency at the MXAT theater (Moscow, Russia), founded by Stanislavski.

Some of her roles include classics such as Suki from the play Celebration by Harold Pinter; Hermia in Midsummer Night's Dream by Shakespeare and Kleopatra in Diary of a Scoundrel by Astrovsky. She participated as part of the cast of the Spanish Repertoire of New York, where she acted in classics such as: Rosita the Solterona and Bodas de Sangre directed by René Buch, as well as the role of “La Brasileña” in Pantaleón and its Visitors, among others.

Her film credits include starring roles in shorts such as 729 and In the Face of Madness, as well as in feature films such as Women, Lotoman, Lotoman 2.0, South of Innocence, Beast of Cardo, The Seven Deaths, etc.

Sarah starred in television roles such as Sofia in the mini-series The Don, Sara in the pilot Dumped, Karina in the pilot Slit NYC, Adriana for the American series Jane The Virgin (currently on the digital platform Netflix).

Miss Jorge León just wrapped a leading performance on the film Candela directed by Andrés Farías (which project was selected at the Fabrique Du Cinema Du Monde in Cannes 2018, as well as selected winner of the IBERMEDIA development fund 2016 and Sundance Screenwriters Lab 2016 and Sundance Editing Lab 2019), where she played the role of Sera Peñablanca.

Miss Jorge León co-starred in the international box office hit film After, led by Hero Fiennes Tiffin and Josephine Langford.

Jorge was nominated in 2015 for the La Silla Awards and the Soberano Award in the "Best Leading Actress" category, for her role in Al Sur de la Inocencia.

Filmography

Ancestry

References

External links
Official website: sarahjorgeleon.com

 
XVIII Muestra Internacional de Cine de Santo Domingo

Living people
1982 births
People from Santo Domingo
Descendants of Buenaventura Báez
Descendants of Ulises Espaillat
Dominican Republic film actresses
Dominican Republic people of Canarian descent
Dominican Republic people of Catalan descent
Dominican Republic people of Cuban descent
Dominican Republic people of French descent
Dominican Republic people of Italian descent
Dominican Republic people of Lebanese descent
Dominican Republic people of Portuguese descent
Dominican Republic people of Venezuelan descent
Dominican Republic people of Walloon descent
Dominican Republic stage actresses
White Dominicans